Severnlea is a locality in the Southern Downs Region, Queensland, Australia.

Geography 
The New England Highway and the Southern railway line pass through the locality from north (Stanthorpe) to south (Glen Alpin).

The Severn River also flows from north to south to the west of the highway and railway.

History 
The locality presumably takes its name from the Severn River.

Beverley State School opened on 30 October 1918. On 15 November 1922, it was renamed Severnlea State School.

Severnlea Methodist Church opened in 1948. When the Methodist Church amalgamated into the Uniting Church in Australia in 1977, it became Severnlea Uniting Church.

Education 
Severnlea State School is a government primary (Prep-6) school for boys and girls at 14 Turner Road. In 2017, the school had an enrolment of 61 students with 4 teachers (3 full-time equivalent) and 5 non-teaching staff (3 full-time equivalent).

There is no secondary school in Severnlea. The nearest government secondary school is Stanthorpe State High School in neighbouring Stanthorpe to the north-east.

Amenities 
Severnlea Uniting Church is at 440 Whiskey Gully Road.

References

Further reading 

 

Southern Downs Region
Localities in Queensland